Gangada is a village in the Balijipeta mandal  of Vizianagaram district in northeastern Andhra Pradesh, India. It is located about 50 km from Vizianagaram city.

Demographics
According to Indian census of 2001, the demographics of this village:
 Total Population  - 3,595
 Males - 1,795
 Females - 1,800
 Children under 6 years of age  -  501 (Boys - 263; Girls - 238)
 Total Literates  - 1,557

References

Villages in Vizianagaram district